The Free Enterprise Group is a grouping of Thatcherite British Conservative Party Members of Parliament founded in mid-2011 by Liz Truss. The book Britannia Unchained was written by members of the group. The group has been associated with the Institute of Economic Affairs.

MPs listed as supporters of this group have included:

, its website address redirects to the website of the Free Market Forum, another IEA-affiliated group that has describes itself as a successor of the Free Enterprise Group.

References 

Conservative Party (UK) factions
2011 establishments in the United Kingdom
 
Liz Truss